is a Japanese engineer and the creator of the Megastar, a planetarium projector which was recorded in Guinness World Records as the planetarium projector that can project the highest number of stars in the world.

Ohira has also designed the Sega Homestar, a home planetarium projector for Sega. According to the Japan Planetarium Association, the popularity of this educational toy has contributed to an increase in visitors to full-sized planetaria in Japan. The newest model, released in 2019, is called Homestar Flux.

Profile 
Ohira was born in Kawasaki, Kanagawa on March 11, 1970, and graduated from faculty of mechanical engineering and graduate school of precision engineering in Nihon University.

References

People from Kawasaki, Kanagawa
1970 births
21st-century Japanese inventors
Japanese mechanical engineers
Living people
Nihon University alumni